Phataimas Muenwong (born 5 July 1995) is a Thai badminton player.

Career 
Muenwong studied at the Rattana Bundit University, and competed at the 2015 and 2017 Summer Universiade. She plays in the women's doubles with her partner Chayanit Chaladchalam. Together they participated in the 2015 Vietnam Open Grand Prix, in the 2016 Chinese Taipei Masters and in the 2015 Chinese Taipei Open Grand Prix Gold.

Achievements

Southeast Asian Games 
Women's doubles

Summer Universiade 
Women's doubles

BWF Grand Prix (1 title, 1 runner-up) 
The BWF Grand Prix had two levels, the Grand Prix and Grand Prix Gold. It was a series of badminton tournaments sanctioned by the Badminton World Federation (BWF) and played between 2007 and 2017.

Women's doubles

  BWF Grand Prix Gold tournament
  BWF Grand Prix tournament

BWF International Challenge/Series (8 titles, 3 runners-up) 
Women's doubles

Mixed doubles

  BWF International Challenge tournament
  BWF International Series tournament
  BWF Future Series tournament

References

External links 
 

Living people
1995 births
Phataimas Muenwong
Badminton players at the 2018 Asian Games
Phataimas Muenwong
Asian Games medalists in badminton
Medalists at the 2018 Asian Games
Competitors at the 2019 Southeast Asian Games
Competitors at the 2021 Southeast Asian Games
Phataimas Muenwong
Phataimas Muenwong
Southeast Asian Games medalists in badminton
Universiade silver medalists for Thailand
Universiade bronze medalists for Thailand
Universiade medalists in badminton
Medalists at the 2015 Summer Universiade
Medalists at the 2017 Summer Universiade
Phataimas Muenwong